Anischnopteris is a genus of moths in the family Geometridae described by Rindge in 1983.

Species
Anischnopteris chryses Druce, 1893

References

Nacophorini
Geometridae genera